The Barry Sheene Medal is an annual award honouring the achievements of a driver in the Supercars Championship, an Australian touring car series. Tony Cochrane, the chairman of the championship's organising body Australian Vee Eight Supercar Company (AVESCO), instigated the award in 2003. The medal is named after the two-time Grand Prix motorcycle world champion and motor racing television commentator Barry Sheene. It is presented to the driver adjudged to have displayed "outstanding leadership, media interaction, character, personality, fan appeal and sportsmanship throughout the season". A panel of motor racing journalists individually award three drivers scores of three, two and one points after every event of the season. The results are announced at the series' end-of-season gala in Sydney.

Drivers consider it the second-most prestigious award after the drivers' championship, and it is frequently likened to Australian rules football's Brownlow Medal and rugby league's Dally M Medal. The inaugural recipient was the Stone Brothers Racing driver Marcos Ambrose in 2003. He won his first drivers' championship title that year. Ambrose claimed a second championship title the following year and earned a second medal win. Since then, four drivers have won the award more than once: Craig Lowndes, Jamie Whincup, Scott McLaughlin and David Reynolds. Australian drivers have earned the medal fourteen times and New Zealanders four times. Lowndes has the most victories of any competitor, collecting the award five times: in 2005, 2006, 2011, 2013 and 2015. Lee Holdsworth was named the 2022 recipient, his first victory.

Winners

Statistics

See also
 Mike Kable Young Gun Award

Notes

References

Supercars Championship
Auto racing trophies and awards
Australian sports trophies and awards
Awards established in 2003